American Eagle, in comics, may refer to:

American Eagle (DC Comics), a cartoon animal superhero and member of the Zoo Crew, published by DC Comics
American Eagle (Marvel Comics), a Native American superhero appearing in Marvel Comics publications
American Eagle (Standard Comics), a superhero published by Standard Comics during the Golden Age of Comics
Blue Eagle (comics), a superhero appearing in Marvel Comics, originally known as American Eagle

See also
American Eagle (disambiguation)